GRE Subject Biochemistry, Cell and Molecular Biology was a standardized exam provided by ETS (Educational Testing Service) that was discontinued in December 2016. It is a paper-based exam and there are no computer-based versions of it. ETS places this exam three times per year: once in April, once in October and once in November. Some graduate programs in the United States recommend taking this exam, while others require this exam score as a part of the application to their graduate programs. ETS sends a bulletin with a sample practice test to each candidate after registration for the exam.  There are 180 questions within the biochemistry subject test.

Scores are scaled and then reported as a number between 200 and 990; however, in recent versions of the test, the maximum and minimum reported scores have been 760 (corresponding to the 99 percentile) and 320 (1 percentile) respectively. The mean score for all test takers from July, 2009, to July, 2012, was 526 with a standard deviation of 95.
After learning that test content from editions of the GRE® Biochemistry, Cell and Molecular Biology (BCM) Test has been compromised in Israel, ETS made the decision not to administer this test worldwide in 2016–17.

Content specification

Since many students who apply to graduate programs in biochemistry do so during the first half of their fourth year, the scope of most questions is largely that of the first three years of a standard American undergraduate biochemistry curriculum. A sampling of test item content is given below:

Biochemistry (36%)

A Chemical and Physical Foundations

Thermodynamics and kinetics
Redox states
Water, pH, acid-base reactions and buffers
Solutions and equilibria
Solute-solvent interactions
Chemical interactions and bonding
Chemical reaction mechanisms

B Structural Biology: Structure, Assembly, Organization and Dynamics
Small molecules
Macromolecules (e.g., nucleic acids, polysaccharides, proteins and complex lipids)
Supramolecular complexes (e.g., membranes, ribosomes and multienzyme complexes)

C Catalysis and Binding

Enzyme reaction mechanisms and kinetics
Ligand-protein interaction (e.g., hormone receptors, substrates and effectors, transport proteins and antigen-antibody interactions)

D Major Metabolic Pathways

Carbon, nitrogen and sulfur assimilation
Anabolism
Catabolism
Synthesis and degradation of macromolecules

E Bioenergetics (including respiration and photosynthesis)

Energy transformations at the substrate level
Electron transport
Proton and chemical gradients
Energy coupling (e.g., phosphorylation and transport)

F Regulation and Integration of Metabolism

Covalent modification of enzymes
Allosteric regulation
Compartmentalization
Hormones

G Methods

Biophysical approaches (e.g., spectroscopy, x-ray, crystallography, mass spectroscopy)
Isotopes
Separation techniques (e.g., centrifugation, chromatography and electrophoresis)
Immunotechniques

Cell biology (28%)

Methods of importance to cellular biology, such as fluorescence probes (e.g., FRAP, FRET and GFP) and imaging, will be covered as appropriate within the context of the content below.

A. Cellular Compartments of Prokaryotes and Eukaryotes: Organization, Dynamics and Functions

Cellular membrane systems (e.g., structure and transport across membrane)
Nucleus (e.g., envelope and matrix)
Mitochondria and chloroplasts (e.g., biogenesis and evolution)

B. Cell Surface and Communication
Extracellular matrix (including cell walls)
Cell adhesion and junctions
Signal transduction
Receptor function
Excitable membrane systems

C. Cytoskeleton, Motility and Shape
Regulation of assembly and disassembly of filament systems
Motor function, regulation and diversity

D. Protein, Processing, Targeting and Turnover

Translocation across membranes
Posttranslational modification
Intracellular trafficking
Secretion and endocytosis
Protein turnover (e.g., proteosomes, lysosomes, damaged protein response)

E. Cell Division, Differentiation and Development

Cell cycle, mitosis and cytokinesis
Meiosis and gametogenesis
Fertilization and early embryonic development (including positional information, homeotic genes, tissue-specific expression, nuclear and cytoplasmic interactions, growth factors and induction, environment, stem cells and polarity)

Molecular biology (36%)

A. Genetic Foundations

Mendelian and non-Mendelian inheritance
Transformation, transduction and conjugation
Recombination and complementation
Mutational analysis
Genetic mapping and linkage analysis

B. Chromatin and Chromosomes

Karyotypes
Translocations, inversions, deletions and duplications
Aneuploidy and polyploidy
Structure
Epigenetics

C. Genomics

Genome structure
Physical mapping
Repeated DNA and gene families
Gene identification
Transposable elements
Bioinformatics
Proteomics
Molecular evolution

D. Genome Maintenance

DNA replication
DNA damage and repair
DNA modification
DNA recombination and gene conversion

E. Gene Expression/Recombinant DNA Technology

The genetic code
Transcription/transcriptional profiling
RNA processing
Translation

F. Gene Regulation

Positive and negative control of the operon
Promoter recognition by RNA polymerases
Attenuation and antitermination
Cis-acting regulatory elements
Trans-acting regulatory factors
Gene rearrangements and amplifications
Small non-coding RNA (e.g., siRNA, microRNA)

G. Viruses

Genome replication and regulation
Virus assembly
Virus-host interactions

H. Methods

Restriction maps and PCR
Nucleic acid blotting and hybridization
DNA cloning in prokaryotes and eukaryotes
Sequencing and analysis
Protein-nucleic acid interaction
Transgenic organisms
Microarrays

See also

 Graduate Record Examination
 GRE Biology Test
 GRE Chemistry Test
 GRE Literature in English Test
 GRE Mathematics Test
 GRE Physics Test
 GRE Psychology Test
 Graduate Management Admission Test (GMAT)
 Graduate Aptitude Test in Engineering (GATE)

References 

GRE standardized tests